Reuben Te Rangi (born 14 October 1994) is a New Zealand professional basketball player for the Auckland Tuatara of the New Zealand National Basketball League (NZNBL). He is also contracted with the South East Melbourne Phoenix of the Australian National Basketball League (NBL) and is a regular New Zealand Tall Black.

Early life
Te Rangi was born in Auckland and raised in the South Auckland suburb of Manurewa. He attended Auckland Grammar School and played junior basketball for Counties Manukau Basketball Association.

Professional career

Australian NBL
Te Rangi made his debut in the Australian NBL during the 2012–13 season as a development player with the New Zealand Breakers. He was subsequently a member of the Breakers' championship-winning team. For the 2013–14 season, he was elevated to the Breakers' roster on a full-time contract. In March 2015, he won his second NBL championship when the Breakers defeated the Cairns Taipans in the NBL Grand Final. A year later, he helped the Breakers reach the 2016 NBL Grand Final series, where they were defeated by the Perth Wildcats.

In April 2016, Te Rangi joined the Brisbane Bullets. In February 2019, he was named the NBL's Best Sixth Man and Most Improved Player.

On 22 July 2020, Te Rangi signed a two-year deal with the South East Melbourne Phoenix.

On 24 March 2022, Te Rangi signed a two-year contract extension with the Phoenix. In January 2023, he played his 300th NBL game.

New Zealand NBL
Te Rangi made his debut in the New Zealand NBL in 2012 with the Harbour Heat and subsequently won the Rookie of the Year award.

In 2013, Te Rangi joined the Southland Sharks and helped them win the championship. He returned to the Sharks in 2014 but was cut mid-season following an off-court incident in New Plymouth.

For the 2015 season, Te Rangi joined the Super City Rangers. He returned to the Rangers in 2016 and helped them reach the NBL final, where they lost to the Wellington Saints.

For the 2017 season, Te Rangi was welcomed back to the Southland Sharks. He helped the Sharks reach the NBL final, where they lost to the Wellington Saints. In 2018, Te Rangi helped the Sharks avenge their defeat to the Saints by beating them in the final behind his Finals MVP performance.

For the 2019 season, Te Rangi joined the Wellington Saints. He went on to play in his fourth straight NBL final, where he won his third NBL championship. He played for the Canterbury Rams in 2020 and is set to play for the Auckland Tuatara in 2023.

NBL1
On 11 March 2021, Te Rangi signed with the Knox Raiders for the 2021 NBL1 South season. He re-joined the Raiders for the 2022 NBL1 South season.

National team career
In 2012, Te Rangi played for the Junior Tall Blacks at the FIBA Oceania Under-18 Championship and the Albert Schweitzer Tournament. He made his debut for the Tall Blacks in 2013 and played at the FIBA Oceania Championships in the same year. He went on to play at the 2015 FIBA Oceania Championship. He captained the Tall Blacks at the 2017 Asia Cup in Lebanon, and in 2018, he was a member of the bronze medal winning team at the Commonwealth Games. He played during the 2019 FIBA World Cup Asia Qualifiers, but missed the World Cup due to injury.

Personal
Te Rangi is the son of Alex and Piloma, and he has two siblings, sister Aerin and brother Dante.

References

External links
NBL profile

1994 births
Living people
Basketball players at the 2018 Commonwealth Games
Basketball players from Auckland
Brisbane Bullets players
Canterbury Rams players
Commonwealth Games bronze medallists for New Zealand
Commonwealth Games medallists in basketball
New Zealand Breakers players
New Zealand men's basketball players
People educated at Auckland Grammar School
Shooting guards
Small forwards
South East Melbourne Phoenix players
Southland Sharks players
Super City Rangers players
Wellington Saints players
Medallists at the 2018 Commonwealth Games